Johannes Baptist Franzelin (b. at Aldein, in Tyrol, 15 April 1816; d. at Rome, 11 December 1886) was an Austrian Jesuit theologian and Cardinal.

Life
Johann Baptist Franzelin was born 15 April 1816, in Aldein, Austria, the son of Pellegrino and Anna Wieser Franzelin.
Despite their poverty, his parents sent him at an early age to the neighboring Franciscan college at Bolzano. In 1834, he entered the Society of Jesus at Graz, and after some years spent in higher studies and teaching in Austrian Poland began in 1845 his course of theology in the Roman college of the Society, where he acted as an assistant in Hebrew, in which he was especially proficient.

Driven from Rome by the revolution of 1848, he went successively to England, Belgium, and France, where he was ordained in 1849. In 1850, he returned to the Roman college as assistant professor of dogma and lecturer on Arabic, Syriac, and Chaldean. In 1853, he became prefect of studies in the German college, and, in 1857, professor of dogmatic theology in the Roman college, where he remained for nineteen years, winning for himself by his lectures and publications a foremost place among the theologians of that time. During this period, he acted as Consultor to several Roman Congregations and aided in the preliminaries of the First Vatican Council. In 1876, despite his protests, he was raised to the cardinalate by Pope Pius IX, and participated in the papal conclave of 1876 which elected Pope Leo XIII.

Though of delicate heath, the appointment made little change in his scrupulously simple lifestyle. As a cardinal, his sole departure from strict adherence to the Jesuit rule was to omit the daily recreation. Moreover, though constantly engaged as prefect of the Congregation of Indulgences and Relics and consultor of several other congregations, he steadily refused the aid of a secretary. His entire income as cardinal he distributed among the poor, the foreign missions, and converts whose property had been seized by the Italian government.

Cardinal Franzelin died in Rome on 11 December 1886. On the centenary of his death, his remains were exhumed and transferred to the parish church of his native Aldein.

Works
As a theologian, Franzelin takes high rank. He served as papal theologian to the First Vatican Council.

From the first his works were recognized as a mine of rich material for the preacher; and for years he was accustomed to receive numerous letters from priests in all parts of the world, spontaneously acknowledging the great aid in preaching they had derived from his books. Of his works, which have gone through numerous editions, the treatise "De Divina Traditione et Scriptura" (Rome, 1870) is considered a classic. Other works include:

"De SS. Eucharistiæ Sacramento et Sacrificio" (1868);
"De Sacramentis in Genere" (1868);
"De Deo Trino" (1869);
"De Deo Uno" (1870);
"De Verbo Incarnato" (1870);
some smaller treatises, and the posthumous "De Ecclesia Christi".

References

Sources

 
 
Commentarius de Vita Eminentissimi Auctoris in 

1816 births
1886 deaths
19th-century Austrian Jesuits
19th-century Austrian cardinals
Cardinals created by Pope Pius IX
19th-century Austrian Roman Catholic theologians
Jesuit theologians
People from Aldein
Jesuit cardinals